Rivière-du-Loup Airport  is located  south southwest of Rivière-du-Loup, Quebec, Canada.

References

Registered aerodromes in Bas-Saint-Laurent
Transport in Rivière-du-Loup